The BeNe League is the highest-level professional ice hockey league in Belgium and the Netherlands from 2015 to 2022. The league was founded in 2015, following a merger between the Belgian Hockey League and the Dutch Eredivisie and thus became the top tier of the sport in both nations. In terms of league structure, the BeNe League is made up of 11 teams, 6 from the Netherlands and a further 5 from Belgium, and they all play in a single group. The league featured a mix of Belgian, Dutch, European and overseas players.

Overview

The BeNe League is made up of 11 teams, 6 based in the Netherlands and 5 based in Belgium. In the first season, the league comprised 16 teams (10 from the Netherlands and 6 from Belgium). These 16 teams were split into two groups, each containing 5 Dutch teams and 3 Belgian teams. Each team played a total of 22 games over the course of the regular season, they played each team in their division twice, as well as once against every team in the other division. Points are awarded in the following fashion, 3 points for a win, 2 for a win in overtime and 1 for an overtime loss.

At the end of the regular season, the top 4 teams from each division qualified for the playoffs. The playoff quarterfinals were played over two legs, whilst the semi-finals and final were both played as a best of three series. The winner of the playoffs was then crowned the league victor. On top of this, the league also crowns National Champions from each country. The team that advances the furthest through the playoffs from each country is subsequently crowned as National Champion.

One of the Netherlands most successful ice hockey teams, the Tilburg Trappers, announced that they would not be a part of the BeNe League, and would instead join the Oberliga, the 3rd tier of ice hockey in Germany. They do however, operate a developmental team in the BeNe League in the form of Tilburg Trappers II.

History
Following the 2009 season of the Belgian Hockey League, HYC Herentals and White Caps Turnhout decided to the join the Eredivisie, whilst the remaining 3 teams dropped down a division and played instead in the Belgian National League. This resulted in the North Sea Cup being played in place of both the Belgian Hockey League and the Eredivisie. Following the culmination of the 2011–12 season, in which White Caps Turnhout dropped out midway through the season, followed by the Leuven Chiefs also stating they would be leaving the competition, it was announced that the Eredivisie would once again take place, and that HYC Herentals would participate. A reformed Belgian Hockey League, featuring both Leuven Chiefs, White Caps Turnhout, and former Belgian National League teams would also take place.

The Geleen Eaters released a statement via their website stating they were unsure if they would be able to compete in the 2014/15 Eredivisie due to lack of funding, which is an issue that also occurred the previous year. On August 26, 2014 Geleen stated that in order to participate in the upcoming season they would have to raise somewhere in the region of €60,000.

This was soon followed by an announcement that the Dordrecht Lions would be dropping down to the Eerst Divisie, and it was subsequently reported in September 2014 that the Eredivisie was in a state of Crisis due to the fact that the league was reduced to five participants. Furthermore, one of those five teams, Eindhoven Kemphanen, declared that they had no interest playing in a five team league, which potentially reduced the Eredivisie down to four teams for the 2014/15 season.

Eindhoven Kemphanen subsequently agreed to play in a 5 team league, which also featured Geleen Eaters, HYC Herentals, Heerenveen Flyers and Tilburg Trappers, and as a result the Eredivisie went ahead.

Following the difficulties both leagues had suffered in the recent years, the hockey federations of both nations worked in partnership, and on 12 June 2015, it was announced that the Belgian Hockey League and the Eredivisie would merge in to the BeNe League.

On 13 March 2016, it was announced that GIJS Groningen would be joining the BeNe League from the Eerst Divisie bringing the number of teams up to 17. It was subsequently announced on 16 June 2016 that the Dordrecht Lions would not be playing in the BeNe League for the upcoming season, instead dropping down a division to the Eerst Divisie. This means that the 2016–17 edition of the BeNe League is projected to stay at 16 teams.

Season format
In the main round, all 13 teams play a double round competition in the regular season. With this, each team will play 24 games.

The top eight participants from the main round qualify for the play-offs. Playoff quarterfinals and semi-finals will be played as best of three series whilst the final will be played as a best of five series with the winner being crowned as BeNe League Champion.

Teams
The following teams will participate in the 2019/2020 BeNe League.

Former Teams

 1 Utrecht withdrew their application in June 2015.

Players
The BeNe League relies heavily on Belgian and Dutch native players, and as a result the majority of players on the Belgian and Dutch national teams ply their trade in the BeNe League.

Overseas players (termed imports) are allowed in the league however, with each team being able to sign two imports. An import is defined as any player who is not eligible to play for either the Belgian or Dutch national teams.

Champions

References

External links
 
 Royal Belgian Ice Hockey Federation
 Dutch Ice Hockey Board

Defunct ice hockey leagues in Europe
Ice hockey leagues in the Netherlands
Benelux
Professional sports leagues in the Netherlands
Professional ice hockey leagues in Belgium
Multi-national ice hockey leagues in Europe
Multi-national professional sports leagues